The Great Lakes Quilt Center is the Michigan State University Museum’s center for quilt-related research, education, and exhibition activities. While the museum, established in 1857, has long held significant collections, its focus of activities on quilt scholarship and education began with the launch of the Michigan Quilt Project at the museum in 1984. The Michigan Quilt Project not only spearheaded the documentation of the state's quiltmaking history, but also stimulated interest in strengthening the museum's quilt collection, upgrading its care, and expanding its use. As of 2008, the Michigan Quilt Project has collected documentation on over 9000 quilts in the state and the collection of quilts numbers over 700 with significant examples from Michigan and the Great Lakes region, examples of quilts from numerous African countries, major ethnographic collections of Native American quilts and Michigan African American quilts, and special collections assembled by Kitty Clark Cole, Harriet Clarke, Merry and Albert Silber, Deborah Harding, and Betty Quarton Hoard. The MSU Museum also houses two important collections developed by pioneering American quilt historians Cuesta Benberry and Mary Schafer.

In partnership with MATRIX: Center for Humane Arts, Letters, and Social Sciences OnLine and the Alliance for American Quilts, the MSU Museum/Great Lakes Quilt Center has spearheaded the development of two major national projects. The multimedia Quilt Treasures Project develops “web portraits” built from video-taped oral history and supporting archival materials. These web portraits document the lives, work, and influence of leaders of the American quilt revival of the last quarter of the 20th century. The Quilt Index is a national digital repository of quilt and quilt-related collections in distributed physical repositories. The Quilt Index digitally preserves the collections and makes them accessible and searchable for research and teaching. The project was beta-tested with the collections of the MSU Museum and, as of 2008, the repository holds over 18000 quilts from nine collections. By the end of 2010, another twelve collections will be added and plans are underway for the addition of scores more.

Stated goals

According to the GLQC website, the primary goals of the center are to:
 Record written and oral history documenting quilting and the personal histories of quiltmakers
 Expand and maintain a research collection of information on Great Lakes quilting
 Initiate educational and exhibition programs to bring quilting history to a wider audience
 Increase awareness of textile conservation issues and support preservation efforts of endangered textiles
 Identify and recognize quilters and quilting traditions from diverse regional, social, economic, and ethnic backgrounds
 Honor outstanding individual quilters and quilt groups through the Michigan Heritage Awards and other programs
 Support the continuation of traditional quilting styles and practices through the Michigan Traditional Arts Apprenticeship Program
 Publish information on Great Lakes quilts, quilters, and quilting

Collections

The Great Lakes Quilt Center is home to several distinct quilt and textile collections.  These include:
 Michigan African American Quilt Collection
 The Clarke Family Quilt Collection
 Kitty Clark Cole Quilt Collection
 Durkee-Blakeslee-Quarton-Hoard Family Quilt Collection
 The Deborah Harding Redwork Collection
 International Textile Collection
 Michigan Quilts
 North American Indian and Native Hawaiian Quilt Collection
 Merry and Albert Silber Quilt Collection
 Cuesta Benberry African and African-American Quilt and Quilt Ephemera Collection

Exhibitions

 Quilts from MSU Museum Collections, Battle Creek, MI, 1987
 New Donations to the MSU Museum’s Quilts Collections, MSUM, 1987
 Stories in Thread: Hmong Pictorial Embroidery, MSUM, 1987
 Quilts in the Classroom, MSUM, 1987
 Michigan Quilts: 150 Years of a Textile Tradition, MSUM, 1987
 Michigan Quilts: 150 Years of a Textile Tradition, Kresge Art Museum, 1987
 Michigan Quilts: 150 Years of a Textile Tradition, Michigan Historical Museum, 1987
 Quilts from the Merry and Albert Silber Collection, MSUM, 1988
 Michigan Quilts, Chicago Hilton, 1989
 Quilts of Rosie Wilkins: Improvisational Quiltmaking in the African-American Tradition, Michigan Women’s Historical Center, 1989
 The Names Quilt Project Quilt: Traditions in Needlework in Social Change and Public Memorials, MSUM, 1990
 African-American Quiltmaking Traditions in Michigan, MSUM, 1991
 Quilts from the Michigan State University Museum Collection, Muskegon Museum of Art, 1992
 A Family Legacy: Quilts from the Clarke Collection, MSUM, 1993
 Native Quilts and Quilters: A National Gathering, MSUM, 1996
 To Honor and Comfort: Native Quilting Traditions, 1998
 Native Quilts from the Michigan State University Museum Collection, Petoskey, MI, 1998
 Native American Quilts from the Southwest: Tradition, Creativity and Inspiration, Institute for American Indian Art, Santa Fe, NM, 1998
 Great Lakes Native Quilting, MSUM, 1999
 American Quilt Study Group’s Seminar exhibits, MSUM, 1999
 Oklahoma Quilt (memorial to the bombing), MSU Ad Building, 2000
 Michigan Quilt Project: New Discoveries, MSUM, 2001
 The Mary Schafer: A Legacy of Quilt History, MSUM, 2001
 Quilts from the MSU Museum, Novi, MI, 2001
 Great Lakes, Great Quilts, contest winners various venues, 2002
 American Quilts from the Michigan State University Museum, Japan, 2003
 Quilts Old and New: Reproductions from the Great Lakes Quilt Center, MSUM, 2003
 Weavings of War: Fabrics of Memory, MSUM, 2006
 Redwork: A Textile Tradition in America, MSUM, 2006
 Quilts and Human Rights, MSUM, 2008

Current traveling exhibits

The following exhibitions were organized by the Great Lakes Quilt Center:

 To Honor and Comfort: Native Quilting Traditions
 Great Lakes Native Quilting
 Michigan Quilt Project Blocks
 The Mary Schafer Collection: A Legacy of Quilt History
 Quilts Old and New: Reproductions from the Great Lakes Quilt Center
 Quilting Sisters: African-American Quiltmaking in Michigan

On-line exhibits

 To Honor and Comfort: Native Quilting Traditions (virtual version/Michigan State University Museum)
 The Mary Schafer Collection: A Legacy of Quilt History (virtual)
 Mary Schafer: Quilter, Quilt Collector, and Quilt Historian (virtual)
 Quilt Treasures: Presenting Mary Schafer (virtual)
 Redwork: A Textile Tradition in America (virtual)
 Quilts and Human Rights (virtual)
 Weavings of War (virtual)

Projects

Projects directed by the Great Lakes Quilt Center include:
 Michigan Quilt Project, a project that seeks to document significant quilts made or owned in Michigan
 Quilt Index
 H-Quilts, a scholarly discussion list devoted to quilt history and other significant topics in quilting
 Great Lakes Folk Festival, a three-day festival held in August of each year in East Lansing, Michigan that features traditional music, arts, and foods significant to the Great Lakes region

GLQC Projects associated with the Alliance for American Quilts include:
 Michigan "Quilters Save Our Stories"
 Michigan Boxes Under the Bed
 Quilt Treasures

Publications
 MacDowell, Marsha.  (Ed.)  African American Quiltmaking in Michigan. East Lansing, MI: Michigan State University Press, 1997.
 MacDowell, Marsha (Ed.). American Quilts from Michigan State University Museum. Tokyo: Kokusai Art, 2003.
 MacDowell, Marsha.  (Ed.)  Great Lakes, Great Quilts. Lafayette, Calif. : C&T Pub., 2001.
 MacDowell, Marsha and Ruth D. Fitzgerald (Eds).  Michigan Quilts: 150 Years of a Textile Tradition. East Lansing, Mich.: Michigan State University Museum, 1987.
 MacDowell, Marsha.  Stories in Thread: Hmong Pictorial Embroidery.  East Lansing, Mich.: Michigan Traditional Arts Program, Folk Arts Division, Michigan State University Museum, 1989.
 MacDowell, Marsha and C. Kurt Dewhurst (Eds.). To Honor and Comfort: Native Quilting Traditions. Santa Fe, New Mexico: Museum of New Mexico Press, 1997.
 Marston, Gwen and Joe Cunningham. Mary Schafer and Her Quilts. East Lansing, MI: Michigan State University Museum, 1990.
 Marston, Gwen  Q is for Quilt: An ABC Quilt Pattern Book.  East Lansing, Mich.: Michigan State University Museum, 1987.

See also
 The Quilt Index
 Quilt Treasures

References

External links
 Great Lakes Quilt Center
 Michigan Heritage Awards
 Michigan Traditional Arts Apprenticeship Program

Quilting
Quilt museums in the United States
University museums in Michigan
Michigan State University
Art museums established in 1885
Museums in Ingham County, Michigan
Folk art museums and galleries in Michigan
1885 establishments in Michigan